Macaldenia is a genus of moths of the family Noctuidae described by Frederic Moore in 1885. It was formerly considered a synonym of Dysgonia.

Species
Macaldenia palumba (Guenée, 1852)
Macaldenia palumbioides Hampson

References

Catocalinae